The Daily News is a morning newspaper in Red Bluff, California and Tehama County, California. It was founded in November 1885 and is now owned by Digital First Media, formerly MediaNews Group. MediaNews Group acquired it from Donrey in 1999.  The Daily News also publishes supplements to the publications: Tehama The Magazine, Red Bluff Today, Corning Today, Tehama County Visitor's Guide, and the annual Best of Tehama County readers choice awards. . The newspaper has a paid circulation of approximately 7,500 and is published Tuesday through Saturday.

The Old Bank of America Building (1925) at 710 Main St. in Red Bluff became the home of the Daily News in 1969.  The building was designed by architect William H. Weeks and is listed on the National Register of Historic Places.  In 2016, the Red Bluff Daily News main office is located at 728 Main St. In 2021, the News left that address and has gone virtual, with no brick and mortar office.

References

External links
Red Bluff Daily News website
MediaNews Group website

Daily newspapers published in California
Red Bluff, California
Tehama County, California
MediaNews Group publications